Zen lineage charts depict the transmission of the dharma from one generation to another. They developed during the Tang dynasty, incorporating elements from Indian Buddhism and East Asian Mahayana Buddhism, but were first published at the end of the Tang.

History

The idea of a patriarchal lineage in Chan dates back to the epitaph for Fărú (法如 638–689), a disciple of the 5th patriarch, Daman Hongren (弘忍 601–674). In the Long Scroll of the Treatise on the Two Entrances and Four Practices and the Continued Biographies of Eminent Monks, Daoyu and Dazu Huike are the only explicitly identified disciples of Bodhidharma. The epitaph gives a line of descent identifying Bodhidharma as the first patriarch.

In the 6th century biographies of famous monks were collected. From this genre the typical Chan lineage was developed:

According to McRae, the schema developed over the course of several centuries. It is a combined product of Indian and Chinese culture, which inherited elements "from the larger tradition of East Asian Mahayana Buddhism" such as the seven Buddhas of the past:

The complete system was published perhaps as early as 801 but certainly by the year 952.

D. T. Suzuki contends that Chan's growth in popularity during the 7th and 8th centuries attracted criticism that it had "no authorized records of its direct transmission from the founder of Buddhism" and that Chan historians made Bodhidharma the 28th patriarch of Buddhism in response to such attacks.

Lineages

The Indian Lineage From Shakyamuni to Bodhidharma
The earliest descriptions of the Chán-lineage evolved into a continuous lineage from Śākyamuni Buddha to Bodhidharma. The idea of a line of descent from Śākyamuni Buddha is the basis for the distinctive lineage tradition of the Chán school. The Denkoroku, "Transmission of the Light", written by Keizan, gives 28 patriarchs in this transmission:

The First Six Ancestors of the Chinese Lineage
The earliest lineages described the lineage from Bodhidharma to Huineng. There is no generally accepted 7th Chinese Patriarch.

The principle teachers of the Chan, Seon and Zen traditions are commonly known in the first English translations as Patriarchs; however, the current trend is to use the more precise terminology of "Ancestors" or "Founders" (祖) and "Ancestral Masters" or "Founding Masters" (祖師) as the original terms are gender neutral. Various records of different authors are known, which give a variation of transmission lines:

Tang dynasty

Hongren - Huineng - Northern School - Shitou-lineage - Mazu-lineage - Southern School

The period of Dayi Daoxin ( 580–651) and Daman Hongren ( 601–674) came to be called the East Mountain Teaching, due to the location of the residence of Hongren at Huamgmei. The term was used by Yuquan Shenxiu, the most important successor to Hongren.

Yuquan Shenxiu (神秀 606?-706) was the most important successor to Daman Hongren. In 701 he was invited to the Imperial Court by Wu Zetian, who paid him due imperial reverence. The first lineage documents were produced in this period.

According to tradition, the sixth and last ancestral founder, Huineng (惠能; 638–713), was one of the giants of Chan history, and all surviving schools regard him as their ancestor.

Shenhui, a successor to Huineng, claimed Huineng to be the successor of Hongren instead of the publicly recognized successor Yuquan Shenxiu. The most prominent of the successors of Shenhui's lineage was Guifeng Zongmi Shenhui's influence is traceable in the Platform Sutra, which gives a popular account of the story of Huineng, but also reconciles the antagonism created by Shenhui. Shenhui himself does not figure in the Platform Sutra; he was effectively written out of Chan history.

Shitou Xiqian - Fayan School - Yunmen school - Caodong/Soto school

The details of Shítóu's life are found in traditional biographies. Scholar Mario Poceski writes that Shítóu does not appear to have been influential or famous during his lifetime. Sayings to the effect that Shitou and Mazu Daoyi were the two great masters of their day date from decades after their respective deaths. Shítóu's retrospective prominence owes much to the importance of Dongshan Liangjie, a 9th-century teacher who traced his lineage back to Shítóu.

Mazu - Hongzhou school - Guiyang school - Linji school
Traditionally, Mazu Daoyi is depicted as a successor in the lineage of Huineng, since his teacher Nanyue Huairang is regarded as a student and successor of Huineng. This connection between Huineng and Nanyue Huairang is doubtful, being the product of later rewritings of Chan history to place Mazu Daoyi in the traditional lineages.

Mazu Daoyi is perhaps the most influential teaching master in the formation of Chan Buddhism. While Chan became the dominant school of Buddhism during the Song dynasty, the later Tang dynasty and Mazu Daoyi's Hongzhou school became regarded as the "golden age" of Chan. The An Lushan Rebellion (755-763) led to a loss of control by the Tang dynasty, and metropolitan Chan began to lose its status while "other schools were arising in outlying areas controlled by warlords. These are the forerunnersof the Chan we know today. Their origins are obscure; the power of Shen-hui's preaching is shown by the fact that they all trace themselves to Hui-neng."

Song dynasty - The Five Houses of Chán
During the Song the Five Houses (Ch. 五家) of Chán, or five "schools", were recognized. These were not originally regarded as "schools" or "sects", but based on the various Chán-genealogies. Historically they have come to be understood as "schools".

The Five Houses of Chán are:
 Guiyang school (潙仰宗), named after masters Guishan Lingyou (771–854) and Yangshan Huiji (813–890), dharma-descendants of Mazu Daoyi;
 Linji school (臨濟宗), named after master Linji Yixuan (died 866), whose lineage came to be traced back to Mazu, establishing him as the archetypal iconoclastic Chán-master;
 Caodong school (曹洞宗), named after masters Dongshan Liangjie (807–869) and Caoshan Benji (840–901);
 Yunmen school (雲門宗), named after master Yunmen Wenyan (died 949), a student of Xuefeng Yicun (822-908), whose lineage was traced back to Shitou Xiqian:
 Fayan school (法眼宗), named after master Fayan Wenyi (885–958), a "grand-student" of Xuefeng Yicun.

Guiyang school

The Guiyang school (潙仰宗 Guíyáng, Jpn. Igyō) was the first established school of the Five Houses of Zen. Guiyang is named after master Guishan Lingyou (771–854) (Kuei-shan Ling-yu, Jpn. Isan Reiyū) and his student, Yangshan Huiji (807-883, or 813–890) (Yang-shan Hui-chi, Jpn. Kyōzan Ejaku). After founding the Guiyang School, Yangshan moved his school to what is now modern Jiangxi.

The Guiyang school was distinct from the other schools due to its use of esoteric metaphors and imagery in the school's kōans and other teachings.

Fayan school and Yunmen school

Via Xuefeng Yicun the Fayang school and Yunmen school are traced back to Shitou Xiqian and Huineng. Xuefeng was one of the most influential Chán-teachers at the end of the Tang dynasty, when "a widely influential zen center formed around Xuefeng Yicun". The loss of control by the Tang dynasty, and the accompanying loss of support for Buddhist institutions, lead to a regionally based Chan of Xuefeng and his students.

The Zutang ji (祖堂集 "Anthology of the Patriarchal Hall), compiled in 952, the first document which mentions Linji Yixuan, was written to support the Xuefeng Yicun lineage. It pictures this lineage as heir to the legacy of Mazu and the Hongzhou-school, though Xuefeng Yicun's lineage is traced back to Shitou Xiqian (700-790). It was written by two students of Zhaoqing Wendeng (884-972), a dharma descendant of Xuefeng Yicun.

Linji school

During the Northern Song (960–1127), the Song capital was in the northern city of Bianjing (now Kaifeng) and the dynasty controlled most of inner China. The Fayan school was the first faction to gain recognition at the Song court, due to the influence of the buddhist scholar-official Zanning (919-1001). After his death this position was taken over by the linji-faction.

The linji-school of the Song dynasty brought together the classical elements of Zen:
 The denlu-genre, the "Transmission of the Lamp";
 The yulu-genre, the recorded sayings of the masters of the Tang;
 The gongan (koan) collections, describing fictiounous dialogues and interactions between masters and students, supplemented with introductions, commentary and poetry;
 The Hua Tou practice, the meditative concentration on the "word-head" of a gongan as an aid in attaining kensho;
 The notion of "a special transmission outside the scripture" as one of the defining characteristics of Zen.

All of these elements, which shaped the picture of the iconoclastic Zen-master who transmits a wordless truth, were shaped by and dependent on literary  products that shaped the Traditional Zen Narrative which furthered the position of the Linji-school. This narrative did not describe the actual Chán-practice, neither of the Song-dynasty, nor of the Tang dynasty.

According to Welter, the real founder of the Linji-school was Shoushan (or Baoying) Shengnian (首山省念) (926-993), a fourth generation dharma-heir of Linji. The Tiansheng Guangdeng lu (天聖廣燈錄), "Tiansheng Era Expanded Lamp Record", compiled by the official Li Zunxu (李遵勗) (988-1038) confirms the status of Shoushan Shengnian, but also pictures Linji as a major Chan patriarch and heir to the Hongzhou school of Mazu Daoyi, displacing the prominence of the Fayan-lineage. It also established the slogan of "a special transmission outside the teaching", supporting the Linji-school claim of "Chan as separate from and superior to all other Buddhist teachings".

Caodong school

The Caodong school was founded by Dongshan Liangjie and his Dharma-heirs in the 9th century.

Japanese Zen
Twenty-four different Zen-lineages are recorded to be transmitted to Japan. Only three survived until today. Sōtō was transmitted to Japan by Dogen, who travelled to China for Chan training in the 13th century CE. After receiving Dharma transmission in the Caodong line he returned to Japan and established the Sōtō line. The Linji line was also transmitted to Japan several times, where it became known as the Rinzai line.

Soto school

Though Dōgen emphasized the importance of the purity of the teachings, and highly valued lineage and dharma transmission, the Soto-school has its origins in various lineages and dharma transmissions. Dogen received dharma transmission from his Chinese teacher Rujing, with whom he studied two years, but in medieval Soto he was also considered to be a dharma heir of Myōzen, a Rinzai-teacher, with whom he studied eight years. And Tettsū Gikai, the dharma-grandson of Dogen, was also lineage-holder of Nōnin, the founder of the Dharuma-shu, also a Rinzai-school. Gikai passed this lineage over to Keizan, who thereby was also lineage-holder in at least two lineages.

To make the history of Soto even more complicated, the Caodong-lineage that Dogen inherited through Rujing was passed on previously from the Caodong-master Dayang Jingxuan to Touzi Yiqing via the Rinzai-master Fushan Fayuan. Fushan Fayuan had once studied under Dayang Jingxuan. When Jingxuan died Fayuan had received Jingxuan's "portrait, robe, and a verse that expressed his teaching", promising "to pass them on to a suitable successor". Fayuan chose his student Touzi Yiqing to inherit this lineage, a fact that was acknowledged in Keizan's Denkoroku, but "[i]n the standard versions of Dogen's writings, however, all direct references to Yiqing's indirect succession have been eliminated".

Rinzai school

The Linji school was first brought to Japan by Eisai.

The Otokan lineage was founded by Nanpo Jōmyō 南浦紹明 (1235–1308), who received transmission in China from the monk Xutang Zhiyu 虚堂智愚 (Japanese Kido Chigu, 1185–1269) in 1265, who then returned to Japan in 1267. It was then spread by his student Shuho Myocho (second generation) and Kanzan Egen (third generation), who made it an influential school.

The two main schools today are Takujū and Inzan, which both descent from Hakuin.

Western Zen

Although it is difficult to trace when the West first became aware of Zen as a distinct form of Buddhism, the visit of Soyen Shaku, a Japanese Zen monk, to Chicago during the World Parliament of Religions in 1893 is often pointed to as an event that enhanced its profile in the Western world. It was during the late 1950s and the early 1960s that the number of Westerners, other than the descendants of Asian immigrants, pursuing a serious interest in Zen began to reach a significant level. Especially Japanese Zen has gained popularity in the West. Quintessential in this popularity were the books published by D.T. Suzuki. The various books on Zen by Reginald Horace Blyth, and Alan Watts published between 1950 and 1975, contributed to this growing interest in Zen in the West, as did the interest from beat poets such as Jack Kerouac, Allen Ginsberg and Gary Snyder.

The most successful implementation of Zen-practice was brought about by Shunryu Suzuki, Hakuun Yasutani, and Yasutani's student Taizan Maezumi.

Shunryu Suzuki

Shunryu Suzuki (鈴木 俊隆 Suzuki Shunryū, dharma name Shōgaku Shunryū 祥岳俊隆, often called Suzuki Roshi) (born May 18, 1904, Kanagawa Prefecture of Japan; died December 4, 1971, in San Francisco, CA, USA) was a Sōtō Zen monk and teacher who helped popularize Zen Buddhism in the United States, and is renowned for founding the first Buddhist monastery outside Asia (Tassajara Zen Mountain Center). Suzuki founded San Francisco Zen Center, which along with its affiliate temples, comprises one of the most influential Zen organizations in the United States. A book of his teachings, Zen Mind, Beginner's Mind, is one of the most popular books on Zen and Buddhism in the West.

Hakuun Yasutani

 was a Sōtō Rōshi, the founder of the Sanbo Kyodan Zen Buddhist organization. The Sanbõ Kyõdan incorporates Rinzai Kōan study as well as much of Soto tradition, a style Yasutani had learned from his teacher Harada Daiun Sogaku. As founder of the Sanbo Kyodan, and teacher of Taizan Maezumi, Yasutani has been one of the most influential persons in bringing Zen practice to the west. Although the membership of Sanbo Kyodan is small, 3,790 registered followers and 24 instructors in 1988, "the Sanbõkyõdan has had an inordinate influence on Zen in the West". His westerns students have spread out via Taizan Maezumi.

See also
 Dharma transmission
 Lineage (Buddhism)
 Seungsahn

Notes

References

Written references

Web references

Sources

External links
 Map of the Zen Ancestors
 A Directory of various Zen, Dhyāna, Ch'an, Son, Thien Lineages
 Caodong Family Tree
 Hakuin School of Zen Buddhism
 Sanbo Kyodan: Harada-Yasutani School of Zen Buddhism and its Teachers
 Shunryu Suzuki lineage
 Chinese Zen Masters
 T'ang Dynasty Masters, Rinzai Line (from Hui Neng to Hakuin), Roshi Joshu Sasaki lineage

Zen